Pyotr Tolstoy

 Pyotr Andreyevich Tolstoy (1645–1729), Russian statesman and diplomat
 Pyotr Aleksandrovich Tolstoy (1769–1844), Russian general and statesman, great grandson of above
 Pyotr Olegovich Tolstoy (born 1969), Russian broadcaster and parliamentarian